The  is a limited express train service in Japan operated by the East Japan Railway Company (JR East).

Rolling stock
 651-1000 series EMUs

From the start of the revised timetable on 15 March 2014, refurbished 651 series EMUs were introduced on Akagi services, replacing the aging 185 series trains. One return service to and from Shinjuku continues to use 185 series rolling stock.

Former rolling stock 

 185 series EMUs

Future rolling stock 

 E257 Series EMUs (lone 5-car set, effective 18 March 2023)

History
From 14 March 1985, the service was upgraded to limited express status.

From 18 November 2013, one car (car 3 in 7- and 10-car formations, and cars 3 and 10 in 14-car formations) was designated as a reserved-seating car.

From the start of the revised timetable on 15 March 2014, eleven Akagi services running during weekday peak commuting hours were renamed  with all ordinary-class seats reservable.

Since 13 March 2021, this limited express has not run on Ryomo Line and Joetsu Line.

Effective 18 March 2023, all  services will be converted back to ordinary Akagi services with all departures requiring a reservation.

See also
 List of named passenger trains of Japan

References

External links

 JR East 185 series Akagi/Kusatsu/Minakami (Japanese)

Named passenger trains of Japan
East Japan Railway Company
Railway services introduced in 1960
1960 establishments in Japan